Adina Flavia Zotea-Secui, better known by her stage name Adena, is a Romanian singer-songwriter. She debuted in 2011 with her single "S.O.S", produced by Connect-R.

Biography 
Adina Zotea appeared on a recording in 2011 at the age of 19, with the song "S.O.S". In the autumn of the same year, she started a collaboration with Laurenţiu Duţă for the singles "Milkshake" featuring Dony and then "Lay Me Down" in 2012, in collaboration with the Spanish DJ Luis Lopez. A video was made for "Lay Me Down" in Valencia and, thanks to this, the young artist became known in Spain and Latin America, the song being in the top of the charts, like Los 40 Principales. 
At the beginning of 2013, she released the song "Miracle of Love" produced by Mario Morreti. In the autumn of the same year, Adena started a new project alongside DJ Take. This is how "Party Machines" appeared, a rhythmical and cheerful song, dedicated to her clubbing and dance music fans. After a short pause, 2015 began with the song "Tu mano", alongside the DJ and producer Geo Raphael. In the same year, the single "Inocența" appeared, the first song performed in Romanian by Adena. The song is produced by Mario Morreti and Boier Bibescu.

Discography

Singles
 "S.O.S" (2011) 
 "Milkshake" (feat. Dony, 2011)
 "Lay Me Down" (feat. Luis López, 2011) 
 "Miracle of love" (2013)
 "Party Machines" (feat. DJ Take, 2013)
 "Tu mano" (feat. Geo Raphael, 2015)
 "Inocența" (2015)
 "Feel" (feat. Geo Raphael, 2015)
 "Soulmates" (feat. Geo Raphael, 2016)
 "Calentura" (2016)
 "Ea" (feat. Geo Raphael, 2017)
 "Mon Amour" (feat. Geo Raphael, 2018)

References

External links
 Adena on Facebook

Living people
Romanian dance musicians
21st-century Romanian singers
21st-century Romanian women  singers
Romanian women pop singers
English-language singers from Romania
Musicians from Bucharest
Year of birth missing (living people)